Garroniceras is genus of ammonite from the Upper Hauterivian, zones of Balearites balearis to Spathicrioceras seitzi.

References

Hauterivian life
Early Cretaceous ammonites of Europe
Ammonitida genera
Ancyloceratoidea